Bay Tek Entertainment is an American arcade game manufacturer based in Pulaski, Wisconsin. The company specializes in ticket redemption and carnival themed games.

History
Bay Tek was founded in 1977 by Larry Treankler in his father's basement.

In 2016, the company acquired the rights to Skee-Ball.

Notable products
 Axe Master
 Flappy Bird
 Connect Four
 Connect Four Hoops
 HyperNova
 Lil Ticket Monsters
 Pop the Lock
 Prize Hub
 Skee-Ball 
 Whistle Stop (based on the 1946 film of the same name)
 Super Shot
 Quik Drop
 Grand Piano Keys
 Big Bass Wheel
 Ticket Monster
 Gear It Up
 Rock the Rim
 Sink It
 Spin-N-Win
 Willy Crash
 Tower of Tickets

References

 

1977 establishments in Wisconsin
Companies based in Wisconsin